Harry William Sawyer (June 4, 1880 – May 2, 1962) was an American physician and politician.

Sawyer was born in New York City, New York. He served in the United States Navy from 1902 to 1906. He went to the College of Osteopath in Kansas City, Missouri and to the College of Physicians and Surgeons in San Francisco, California. He received his medical degree on Feb. 21 1919 in the state of Texas.Sawyer practiced medicine in Twin Falls, Idaho and in Fallon, Nevada. He served as health officer for Churchill County, Nevada and as draft board physician for Churchill County. Sawyer also served as president of the Nevada Medical Association in 1938 and 1939. Sawyer served in the Nevada Senate from 1935 to 1939 and was involved with the Democratic Party.  His son Grant Sawyer served as Governor of Nevada. Sawyer died at the Veterans Administration Hospital in Reno, Nevada after suffering from a fall.

Notes

External links

1880 births
1962 deaths
Politicians from New York City
Military personnel from New York City
People from Idaho Falls, Idaho
People from Fallon, Nevada
Physicians from Idaho
Physicians from Nevada
Democratic Party Nevada state senators
20th-century American politicians